Flugov post also known as Flugov shunting loop, is a goods station in Saint Petersburg,  built for delivering cargo from tram stations on the Flugov lane (now Kantemirovsky street) to Sestroretsk.

History

On Tovarnaya line 
The station was constructed as a branch of the Primorsky Rail Terminal to Flugov Post line in May, 1904 by engineer Pyotr Alexandrovich Avenarius.

Catastrophic flooding on 23 September 1924 closed the Primorsky Rail Terminal. Another branch to the Finlyandsky Rail Terminal was constructed in 1925 and 1927. By 1926, the line to Sestroretsk had been laid through Lanskaya station. In 1929, the line was reconstructed. The station Flyugov post was no longer required and was dismantled.

On Vyborg line 
Flyugov Post was also the name of a station on the line between Finlyandsky Rail Terminal and Lanskaya, constructed in 1925 and taken out of service in 1934.

Picture gallery

References 

Railway stations opened in 1904
Railway stations closed in 1929
Railway stations opened in 1925
Railway stations closed in 1934